Empire silhouette, Empire line, Empire waist or just Empire is a style in clothing in which the dress has a fitted bodice ending just below the bust, giving a high-waisted appearance, and a gathered skirt which is long and loosely fitting but skims the body rather than being supported by voluminous petticoats. The outline is especially flattering to pear shapes wishing to disguise the stomach area or emphasize the bust. The shape of the dress also helps to lengthen the body's appearance.

While the style goes back to the late 18th century, the term "Empire silhouette" arose over a century later in early 20th-century Britain; here the word empire refers to the period of the First French Empire (1804–1815); Napoleon's first Empress Joséphine de Beauharnais was influential in popularizing the style around Europe.  The word "empire" is pronounced with a special quasi-French pronunciation  in the fashion world.

History
The style began as part of Neoclassical fashion, reviving styles from Greco-Roman art which showed women wearing loose fitting rectangular tunics, known as peplos or the more common chiton, which were belted under the bust, providing support and a cool, comfortable outfit suitable for the warm climate.

The last few years of the 18th century first saw the style coming into fashion in Western and Central Europe (and European-influenced areas). In 1788, just before the Revolution, the court portraitist Louise Élisabeth Vigée Le Brun had held a "Greek supper" where the ladies wore plain white "Greek" tunics. Shorter classical hairstyles, where possible with curls, were less controversial and very widely adopted. Hair was now uncovered even outdoors; except for evening dress, bonnets or other coverings had typically been worn even indoors before. Thin Greek-style ribbons or fillets were used to tie or decorate the hair instead.

Empire dresses were light and loose, usually white, and were often made with short sleeves. A tie around the waistline, sitting just below the bust, was often in a different color. A long rectangular shawl or wrap, very often red with a decorative border in portraits, was also worn, and was lain around the midriff when seated—for which sprawling semi-recumbent postures were favored. By the turn of the 19th century, such styles had spread widely across Europe. In France the style was sometimes called "à la grecque" after the decorations found on the pottery and sculpture of Classical Greek art, though the empire dress had multiple sources, including Marie Antoinette's chemise à la reine, a simple white gown influenced by those worn by European women living abroad in warm climates, including the Americas. Napoleon used the dress in an imperial context, shifting its meaning from Greece to Rome in line with his political agenda during the Empire period.

The adoption of this style led to a drastic contrast between 1790s fashions and the constricting and voluminous styles of the 1770s (with a rigid cylindrical torso above panniers). The change is probably partially due to the French political upheavals after 1789 (which encouraged the recovery of ancient virtues, and discouraged the type of ostentatious ornately luxurious display formerly common in aristocratic fashions). The early styles often featured entirely bare arms, as in the ancient exemplars, but from about 1800 short sleeves became more typical, initially sometimes transparent as in David's Portrait of Madame Récamier (1800), then puffed. The style evolved through the Napoleonic era until the early 1820s, becoming gradually less simple, after which the hourglass Victorian styles became more popular.

English women's styles (often referred to as "regency") followed the same general trend of raised waistlines as French styles, even when the countries were at war. The style was very often worn in white to denote a high social status (especially in its earlier years); only women solidly belonging to what in England was known as the "genteel" classes could afford to wear the pale, easily soiled garments of the era. The look was popularized in Britain by Emma, Lady Hamilton, who designed such garments for her performances of poses in imitation of classical antiquity ("attitudes"), which were a sensation throughout Europe. The high-waisted cut of the dress was also applied to outer garments, such as the pelisse. The Empire silhouette contributed to making clothes of the 1795–1820 period generally less confining and cumbersome than high-fashion clothes of the earlier 18th and later 19th centuries.

The 1960s saw a revival of the style, possibly reflecting the less strict social mores of the era, similar to when the unconstricting 1920s "flapper" styles replaced the heavy corsetry of the early 1900s.

See also
 1750–1795 in fashion
 1795–1820 in fashion
 Corset controversy
 Emma, Lady Hamilton
 Spencer (clothing)
 High-rise (fashion)

References
Notes

Further reading 
 Bourhis, Katell le: The Age of Napoleon: Costume from Revolution to Empire, 1789–1815, Metropolitan Museum of Art, 1989. .
Naomi Lubrich: “The Little White Dress: Politics and Polyvalence in Revolutionary France” in: Fashion Theory. The Journal of Dress, Body and Culture, 19:5, 2015

External links
 

1780s fashion
1790s fashion
1800s fashion
1810s fashion
1960s fashion
1970s fashion
Fashion aesthetics
History of clothing
First French Empire